The Arawak are an indigenous people of South America, and historically of the Caribbean.

Arawak may also refer to:
Lokono, or Arawak, an indigenous Arawak people of South America
Arawak language, or Lokono, the language of the Lokono
Taíno, the Arawakan people who live in the Caribbean
Taíno language, the Arawakan languages of the Taíno people
Arawakan languages, an indigenous language family of South America and the Caribbean